Roaring Rangers is a 1946 American Western film directed by Ray Nazarro and written by Barry Shipman. The film stars Charles Starrett, Adele Roberts, Merle Travis and Smiley Burnette. The film was released on February 14, 1946, by Columbia Pictures.

Plot

Cast          
Charles Starrett as Steve Randall / The Durango Kid
Adele Roberts as Doris Connor 
Merle Travis as Travis
Smiley Burnette as Smiley Burnette
Jack Rockwell as Sheriff Jeff Connor
Ed Cassidy as Bill Connor
Mickey Kuhn as Larry Connor
Edmund Cobb as Taggert
Ted Mapes as Slade
Gerald Mackey as Scrud

References

External links
 

1946 films
1940s English-language films
American Western (genre) films
1946 Western (genre) films
Columbia Pictures films
Films directed by Ray Nazarro
American black-and-white films
1940s American films